Henry Cox (1832–?) was a member of the Virginia House of Delegates in the 1870s.

Henry Cox may also refer to:

Henry Cox (Castlemartyr MP), member of Parliament for Castlemartyr (Parliament of Ireland constituency) from 1787 to 1790
Henry Cox (landowner), founder of Glenmore Park, New South Wales, in 1825
Henry Cox (musical director), founding musical director of Omaha Symphony Orchestra, 1921–1924
Henry Cox (engineer), American engineer, see List of members of the National Academy of Engineering

See also
Henry Coxe (1811–1881), English librarian and scholar
Henry Hippisley Coxe (1748–1795), English politician
Henry Cocks, former United States marine who owned Rancho San Bernabe from 1853 to 1866
Sir Henry Cocke (1538–1610), English courtier and member of Parliament
Harry Cox (disambiguation)